Long-chain-fatty-acid—CoA ligase ACSBG2 is an enzyme that in humans is encoded by the ACSBG2 gene.

References

External links

Further reading 

 
 
 
 

Human proteins